Francesco Stallone Jr. (born July 30, 1950) is an American actor and musician. He is the younger brother of actor Sylvester Stallone and has written music for Sylvester's movies. His song "Far from Over" appeared in the 1983 film Staying Alive and was included on the film's soundtrack album. The song reached number ten on the US Billboard Hot 100 chart and received a Golden Globe nomination for Stallone, while the album itself, consisting of Stallone and various other artists, received a Grammy nomination.

Early life
Stallone was born in Maryland and grew up in Philadelphia. He is the younger son of Jacqueline Stallone (née Labofish; 1921–2020), an astrologer, former dancer, and promoter of women's professional wrestling, and Frank Stallone Sr., a hairdresser. His father was an Italian immigrant, and his mother's family was French from Brittany and also of Eastern European descent. Stallone's brother is actor Sylvester Stallone. In his teen years, he went to Lincoln High School in Northeast Philadelphia.

Career

1980s to 1990s
Stallone has worked as a singer. He wrote and performed "Far from Over" for the 1983 film Staying Alive, which was written and directed by his older brother. The song peaked at No. 10 on the Billboard Hot 100, becoming his only major pop hit, and it was nominated for a Golden Globe award for Best Original Song from a Motion Picture. The album was nominated for a Grammy Award for Best Album of Original Score Written for a Motion Picture or Television Special.

Stallone also played himself in a recurring role on the short-lived sitcom Movie Stars, alongside fellow celebrity siblings Don Swayze and Joey Travolta.

Stallone was the subject of repeated non-sequitur punchlines delivered by comedian Norm Macdonald during the Weekend Update segment of the television show Saturday Night Live.

2000s and 2010s
Stallone appeared as a boxing consultant on the NBC reality television series The Contender in 2005. He appeared on the Howard Stern radio and television shows on several occasions. During one 1992 appearance on The Howard Stern Show, Stallone had a boxing match with television reporter Geraldo Rivera; Stallone won the bout. He was a contestant on Hulk Hogan's Celebrity Championship Wrestling, a reality competition series on CMT that followed ten celebrity contestants as they trained to be professional wrestlers. He also appeared on an episode of Tim and Eric Awesome Show, Great Job!.

On August 17, 2010, the Australian comedy duo Hamish & Andy flew Stallone, then aged 60, to Australia for a one-night-only gig called "Hamish & Andy present: Frank Stallone “Let me be Frank with you” The Fully Franked Tour'". Following a parade in Melbourne, Stallone performed "Far from Over" to an audience of over 2,000 people. Hamish & Andy were big fans of the song, claiming it always pumped them up, and they dubbed the phenomenon "The Frank Effect". Stallone said of the night, "This is seriously one of the best, best times I've ever had."

A documentary directed and produced by Derek Wayne Johnson entitled STALLONE: Frank, That Is about the life, career and survival of Frank Stallone was released in 2021. The documentary features interviews with Sylvester Stallone, Arnold Schwarzenegger, Billy Zane, Geraldo Rivera, Joe Mantegna and many others.

Discography

Studio albums
 Frank Stallone (1984)
 Day in Day Out with The Billy May Orchestra (1991)
 Close Your Eyes with The Sammy Nestico Big Band (1993)
 Soft and Low (1999)
 Full Circle (2000)
 Frankie and Billy (2002)
 Songs from the Saddle (2005)
 Heart and Souls (2007)

Compilation albums
 Stallone on Stallone – By Request (2002) (re-recorded versions)
 In Love in Vain with The Sammy Nestico Orchestra (2003)

Singles

Soundtrack appearances
 "Take You Back" (from Rocky) (1976)
 "Angel Voice / Please Be Someone To Me" (from Paradise Alley) (1978)
 "Na Na Ninni / Two Kinds of Love" (from Rocky II) (1979)
 "Far from Over", "Moody Girl", "I'm Never Gonna Give You Up" with Cynthia Rhodes, I Hope We Never Change, Finding Out the Hard Way, Waking Up (from Staying Alive) (1983)
 "Peace in Our Life" (from Rambo: First Blood Part II) (1985)
 "Bad Nite" (from Over the Top) (1987)
 "You Don't Want to Fight with Me" (from The Expendables 2) (2012)

References

External links
 
 
 

1950 births
Living people
American male film actors
American male television actors
American male singers
Male actors from New York City
American people of Italian descent
American people of French descent
American people of Breton descent
Family of Sylvester Stallone